Cushing is an unincorporated community in Polk County, Wisconsin, United States. Cushing is located on Wisconsin Highway 87 north of St. Croix Falls, in the towns of Laketown and Sterling. Cushing has a post office with ZIP code 54006 and a telephone prefix of 648.

History
The community was named for Caleb Cushing, a Massachusetts politician and diplomat. The post office was established in 1870 with James Smith as the first postmaster.

Notable events
Cushing Fun Days is an annual event that includes turtle races and a soap box derby. Cushing has softball tournaments on both Memorial Day and Labor Day.

References

Unincorporated communities in Polk County, Wisconsin
Unincorporated communities in Wisconsin